Oceanbird is a concept for wind-powered cargo vessels under development by Wallenius Marine. The concept aims to lower emissions by up to 90 percent and the design was developed in collaboration with KTH Royal Institute of Technology and Swedish maritime technology company SSPA. Financial backing for the development was provided by the Swedish Transport Agency. In 2021, Wallenius announced a partnership with Swedish heavy industry company Alfa Laval to further develop the concept's wingsail design. 

The concept features expandable wingsails that can rotate 360 degrees and tilt down if needed. The rigging will be made from steel and composite materials and resemble airplane wings. An auxiliary engine will be used to navigate harbors and provide emergency power.

Such ships are optimized for transatlantic routes. The first vessel based on the concept is planned to set sail in 2026.

In February 2021, shipping company Wallenius Wilhelmsen announced their intention to order a vessel of the Oceanbird concept, tentatively named Orville Wind.

Partnership with ABBA Voyage 
In May 2022, Wallenius was confirmed as the official partner to the concert residency ABBA Voyage in London. In this partnership, Wallenius will act as the exclusive logistics provider for ABBA Voyage, in addition to providing support and consultation around sustainability. The partnership also allows for future Oceanbird vessels to be named after ABBA songs. Inside the ABBA Arena in London, the VIP lounge section is named The Oceanbird Departure Lounge, as an homage to the namesake wind-powered concept.

References 

Proposed ships